The David Bowie Statue is a bronze sculpture of David Bowie sculpted by Andrew Sinclair and unveiled in 2018 in Market Square, Aylesbury, Buckinghamshire by Howard Jones.

Statue

The statue was unveiled in 2018 in Aylesbury where Bowie debuted his Ziggy Stardust character. Entitled "Earthly Messenger", it is situated in Market Square. It features a likeness of Bowie from 2002 and a selection of his alter egos down the years, with Ziggy at the front. Speakers mounted above the life-size piece play a Bowie song every hour.

Money to create the work was raised through grants and a £100,000 crowdfunding  appeal by music promoter David Stopps.

Critical reception
The statue received mixed reviews. Online art magazine Artlyst described it as "hideous", poorly rendered and not fitting a man (Bowie) who loved fine art. Rob Stringer, CEO of Sony Music, described the statue as “beautiful”.

Vandalism
Less than 48 hours after the statue was unveiled, it was vandalised. "Feed the homeless first" was written in front of it, "RIP DB" on a wall beside it and a section of the statue was painted on. In October 2018, it was vandalised for a second time with graffiti sprayed onto the statue, some pavements, doors and hoardings.

References

2018 sculptures
Sculptures of men in the United Kingdom
Statues of musicians
Statue
Statue of David Bowie
Statues in England